Force Reconnaissance (FORECON) is one of the United States Marine Corps' special operations capable forces (SOC) which supplies military intelligence to the command element of the Marine Air-Ground Task Force (MAGTF). Force Reconnaissance companies unlike USMC division reconnaissance report to the Marine expeditionary force (MEF) and provide direct action and deep reconnaissance during large-scale operations. 

The Marine Corps also has Marine Forces Special Operations Command (MARSOC) Raider Battalions that were originally composed of Marine Special Operations Teams formed from Force Recon platoons (Det One) in 2006. MARSOC now has its own separate training pipeline. Force Recon companies continue to operate and focus primarily on direct action, intelligence gathering and maritime raid operations in the visit, board, search, and seizure (VBSS) role.

Mission

Two different mission types emerged during the Vietnam War, which is still implemented in the Force Reconnaissance motives today: Key Hole and Sting Ray. These practices subsequently became contemporary as deep reconnaissance or green operations; and direct action, which are known as black operations.

Key Hole patrols were designed purely around reconnaissance and surveillance; usually lightly equipped and armed with defensive weapons—evasive techniques were employed to break contact from the enemy should the need arise, avoiding contact with the enemy was paramount. Sting Ray operations were the exact opposite of Key Hole missions with goals more closely in line of offensive strikes, the FORECON operators were heavily armed and used artillery and/or naval gunfire support, if available.

However, what began as a 'keyhole' patrol could become a 'stingray' patrol with little warning. The versatility of FORECON is demonstrated when missions quickly turn, planned or not, from a deep reconnaissance patrol to a direct action engagement.

Green operations

Green operations are the principal mission of Force Recon, to collect any pertinent intelligence of military importance, observe, identify and report adversaries to MAGTF commanders. Like Division Recon (also known as the Marine Recon Battalions), they employ a mixed element of amphibious reconnaissance and ground reconnaissance. This practice fundamentally covers a wide spectrum of reconnaissance but primarily the FORECON operators conduct deep reconnaissance.

The Force Recon platoons operate farther inland than their Division Recon counterparts, penetrating deeper into enemy territory from their assigned littoral (coastal) region within a force commander's 'tactical area of responsibility' (TAOR). They operate at such great distances that they are beyond the boundaries, or fan, of any artillery and/or naval gunfire support (NGFS); unlike their Division Recon brethren, whose operations are primarily within the artillery and gunfire support fan. Silence and stealth are vital in reducing chances of compromising their position—if a single round is fired, the mission is deemed to have failed.

The United States Marine Corps Force Reconnaissance detachments, or FORECON, operate in deep reconnaissance, direct action, and the control of supporting arms; to convey military intelligence beyond the means of a commander's area of influence on the battlefield. They are capable of operating independently in combined methods of amphibious and ground operations by utilizing methods of conventional and unconventional warfare in defense of the United States.

Although Force Recon has never been part of the United States Special Operations Command, their missions slightly differentiate them from other United States Special Operations Forces units. Colloquially, they are specialized in all tactical areas of warfare. Force Recon will train with other Special Operations forces, such as United States Navy SEALs, United States Army Special Forces, and United States Air Force Pararescue, in order to master all skill sets. The Marine Corps has seen fit to train versatile specialists rather than specialists in individual areas of combat.

Their reconnoitering roles (whether amphibious or ground) include preliminary (or "pre–D-Day") and post-assault reconnaissance. Some examples are:
 Battle damage assessment (BDA) missions – Witnessing and reporting collateral damage of targets, either from heavy support fire measures (artillery and naval gunfire), air strikes, or thermonuclear weapons.
 Remote sensors operations – Placing remote sensors and beacons is vital for marking friendly/hostile boundaries and areas for helicopter assault and infantry transport. This mission has made pathfinding operations obsolete.
 Initial terminal guidance (ITG)–setting up/preparing landing zones (LZ) and drop zones (DZ) for forward operating sites, Marine fixed or rotary-wing aircraft, or waterborne locations (landing force, ship-to-shore).

Black operations

Black operations are the missions that require direct action (DA). They are the opposite of green operations missions, where the Force Recon operators "look for trouble." Depending on the situation and the target location, the FORECON operators usually conduct direct action missions within the artillery and naval gun support fan; these operations demonstrate "small-scale" shock and awe.

Examples are the seizures and occupation of gas/oil platforms (GOPLAT) and the visit, board, search, and seizure (VBSS) of ships during Maritime Interdiction Operations (MIO), as well as orchestrating close air support, a vital skill exercised in DA missions; Force Recon operators forward observe from static positions and spider holes for artillery and naval gunfire support, or ordnance and payload delivery.

They provide personal security detail (PSD) for critically important personnel. They are capable of performing In-Extremis Hostage Rescue (IHR)

Organization
In the past, early Force Reconnaissance companies in the Marine Corps had made numerous titular changes to its table of organization (T/O), so much so that it can be difficult to describe its primary command structure in detail. However, the companies initially were designed to function under the echelon of the Navy/Marine force commanders (e.g. under the direct operational control of the Commander, Amphibious Task Force (CATF) and Landing Force (CLF), and Fleet Marine Force) during amphibious landing operations or expeditionary engagements—to provide timely intelligence without exhausting their reconnaissance assets from the Marine Division without hampering their valuable support to its infantry regiments.

Due to these changes, FORECON has been detached and reported to multiple commanders of Marine divisions, the Command Elements (CE) of the Marine Air-Ground Task Forces, and the immediate commander of the Marine Expeditionary Force (MEF). They were re-organized or reserved for 'special reconnaissance' assignments that would otherwise help shape the outcome of his battlefield. These companies, for a few times in their existence, had either folded into the Marine Division, its Regiment's Recon Battalions, or dissolved entirely to only resurface during conflicts, or when other similar reasons had arisen.

After the creation of Marine Special Operations Command (MARSOC) on August 11, 2006, it marked the United States Marine Corps' first commitment to the United States Special Operations Command (USSOCOM). By February 2006, 2nd FORECON deactivated its command. The most experienced operators were selected to fill the ranks for the newly established Marine Special Operations Battalions' (MSOBs) teams. A month later in January, 1st FORECON met the same fate. The remaining Marines in both Force Recon companies molded into new "D" companies within the Division Recon Battalions, forming the Deep Reconnaissance Platoons (DRPs). The DRPs are designed to maintain and preserve the 'deep reconnaissance' assets to the MAGTF commanders.

In October 2008, by the direction of the Commandant of the Marine Corps (CMC), the D companies within both 1st and 2nd Reconnaissance Battalions were redesignated as "Force Reconnaissance" companies and assigned operational control to the Marine Expeditionary Force (MEF) accordingly, particularly the I MEF and II MEF. These companies will assume the traditional deep reconnaissance and supportive arms mission set and will deploy in support of current directive required by the United States Marine Corps. Since that time, the Marine Corps has also stood up Force Reconnaissance Company, III MEF in Okinawa, Japan.

The three Force Reconnaissance companies of I, II, and III MEF are currently the only active components of force-level reconnaissance; whereas the 3rd and 4th FORECON are the Selected Reserve force reconnaissance assets available to augment and reinforce the Fleet Marine Force. In the Marine Corps Reserve, the FORECON are separate units reporting directly to the 4th Marine Division Commanding General (4th MarDiv CG), unless mobilized and ordered detached to a Gaining Force Commander. Additionally, as separate units, the FORECON are not part of 4th Reconnaissance Battalion, which is itself a separate unit reporting directly to the 4th MarDiv CG.

Table of Organization (T/O)
Each Force Reconnaissance company is basically the same; they all contain a command element and Force Recon platoons. Each company is commanded by a company commander and his executive officer.

Active

Deactivated

History

The historical roots of 'Force Recon' companies can be traced back to the antecedent Amphibious Reconnaissance Battalion, whose numerous pre-D–Day reconnoitering of enemy beaches during the Pacific campaigns of World War II proved the vitality of the Fleet Marine Force's amphibious reconnaissance doctrine. This unique unit reported directly to the landing force commander, providing him important intelligence at his disposal.

Formed initially as a company-size element from the Observer Group, under the command of Major James L. Jones, they were amongst the first—along with the early Navy Combat Demolition Units (the predecessor to the Underwater Demolition Teams [i.e., the Navy SEALs])—to embark from submarines; most of their missions complemented those of the NCDU and the UDT. The 'amphibious reconnaissance' doctrine clearly outlined that the recon Marines' duties consisted of scouting the littoral areas, or beachhead, and inland; to test the soil permeability for a possible beach landing; to clear any obstacles that may hinder an amphibious assault; and to observe any sign of enemy activity. The Navy UDT were tasked with providing the same, but from off the coastline to the littoral, or adjacent beach areas.

Jones and his recon Marines scouted the Japanese-fortified beaches and observed the terrain, materials or other entities, primarily reporting to the force commander of any vital intelligence of mission-oriented importance. Although Jones's Marines were all skilled surface swimmers, they usually inserted by boats—mostly due to the multiple radios (primary and contingent) they carried, as relaying communication to the landing force commander was paramount, and as a timely means of sending in a platoon-sized element with heavy firepower (mortars, machineguns, etc.) at their disposal since they were greatly outnumbered and isolated from other major Marine forces, which were still embarked on the destroyer-transport ships.

By the end of World War II, the Amphib Recon Battalion terminated its command; its Marines either filled the ranks of other infantry platoons, or folded into the Scout (Tank) companies, and the newly formed division reconnaissance companies. This force-level reconnaissance element was not re-established until the early 1950s, when the Amphibious Reconnaissance Battalions were assembled for preliminary operations in Korea. Their efforts proved that gaining the knowledge of the enemy before a major operation was crucial to safeguarding the men, and provided better operational planning.

The Korean War introduced the new concept of using rotary-wing aircraft to the Marine Corps in combat employment for logistics and rapid troop transport. Also, the atomic age was emerging and caused concern among the military leaders. The Commandant of the Marine Corps, General Lemuel Shepherd created a test unit, the Marine Corps Test Unit 1 (MCTU #1), to research and experiment on new and improved combat tactics and on methods to prepare the Marine Corps to operate strategically, in concert with or against, the use of nuclear weapons.

Many of the conceptual ideas for Force Recon were pioneered by Major Bruce F. Meyers, the test unit's "Reconnaissance/Pathfinder Project Officer" from MCTU #1's Plans and Development (P&D) Section. His position can be seen as an unillustrated subsidiary to an 'operations' (G-6) and 'training' (G-7) officer. Major Meyers tested various innovative techniques for the 'Recon Platoon' and evaluated their results for use in parachuting and pathfinding missions, in addition to using its heliborne and aircraft wing assets to add 'deeper' reconnaissance penetration capabilities. This new-found capability gave reconnaissance Marines the advantage of operating further behind enemy lines.

The MCTU#1's Reconnaissance Platoon, commanded by Captain Joseph Taylor, founded and adopted the more modern 'force reconnaissance' doctrine, methods which were instrumented by Major Meyers. They were developing and performing innovative clandestine insertion methods before the Navy SEALs, and the Army's "Green Berets", such as the submarine locking -in and -out methods, and underwater "blow-and-go" ascents.

The USMC concluded that parachute reconnaissance and pathfinding capabilities would exist at force level, the Fleet Marine Force (the highest command echelon of the United States Marine Corps). At first, the concept was to be formed into a "Force Recon Battalion"—this battalion would have as many 'force recon' companies as there were division-wing MAGTFs in the Marine operating forces. Recognizing the limited budget during the fiscal year of 1957, it was instead recommended that it be formed at company-sized elements for the west and east coast. In July 1957, The MCTU#1 was amalgamated into the existing 1st Amphibious Reconnaissance Battalion. The next day, the battalion cased its colors and redesignated it as 1st Force Reconnaissance Company. Although the test unit was no longer operating, Meyers continued to research and test more innovative methods.

Major Meyers and his top swimmers and senior officers of the company would test and train in submarine lock-in and -out methods and ascending techniques. After being cross-trained by the Navy's Master Divers, they learned the operation of the early rebreather systems, and advanced open water swimming. Meyers understood that his recon Marines would be operating 50 to 150 miles away from their littoral or operating area, or from any naval support. In order to get his Marines out of a "hot" area, extraction techniques needed to be developed. Bruce Meyer's 1st FORECON, along with 1st Recon Company and 1st Marine Aircraft Wing were aware of the McGuire and STABO systems that were used by the United States Army's Special Forces, though they agreed that they had defects and disadvantages. Instead, the Marine Corps created a system that was a more simplified rig that had greater capacity, the Special Personnel Insertion and Extraction (SPIE) rig.

The CIA's highly secretive Special Activities Division (SAD), and more specifically its elite Special Operations Group (SOG), recruit operators from Marine Force Recon. In addition, joint Force Recon and CIA operations go back to the famed Military Assistance Command, Vietnam – Studies and Observations Group (MACV-SOG) during the Vietnam War and still exist to this day.

Weapons Planning Group (Code 121)
The Reconnaissance/Surveillance Section of the Weapons Planning Group, Landing Force Development Center at Quantico introduced Force Recon to new technological methods of achieving their objective. Many of its tests and evaluations resembled the tests of MCTU #1. However, MCTU #1 were testing methods of inserting reconnaissance teams "deep" into the battlefield. The Weapons Planning Group (Code 121) provided the equipment that would become instrumental to recon Marines. Beacons for helicopter guidance, laser designators for the guidance of ordnance, laser rangefinders, and many more were tested.

During the Vietnam War, one of the reconnaissance officers of Code 121, then-Major Alex Lee, brought most of his testing experience to 3rd Force Reconnaissance Company when he was assigned as the commanding officer from 1969 to 1970. He formed Force Recon's missions that are still distinct today: remote sensor operations. The Surveillance and Reconnaissance Center (SRC), predecessor to the Surveillance, Reconnaissance, and Intelligence Group (SRIG), was formed within the III Marine Amphibious Force (IIId MAF). The obsolete pathfinding operations were taken over by the newer beacons and homing devices.

Operations

Vietnam War, 1965–1974

3rd Force Reconnaissance Company was activated, trained, fought, and deactivated during the Vietnam War. Activated in September 1965 as one of the first group of add-on units to meet demands of operations in Vietnam, the company formed at Camp Lejeune, N.C. and satellite on Second Force Reconnaissance Company that was under strength due to the demands for trained Force Recon Marines assigned to First Force in country. Facilities, cadre and equipment for training were provided by Second Force.

Volunteers were solicited from throughout the Marine Corps and the first four months were devoted to bringing the company up to strength in personnel. Beginning in January 1966 all operational personnel departed Camp Lejeune to train in the Caribbean and Panama. Returning to North Carolina in March, final preparations were carried out to meet the projected deployment date in May 1966. The expected deployment of the entire company did not occur, but a two platoon detachment embarked on the USS Boxer, transited through the Suez Canal, and arrived in country in time to be introduced to combat in Operation Hastings as part of The Special Landing Force in early July 1966.

The company (-) dropped to a not combat ready readiness status. Headquarters Marine Corps transferred several Officers and numerous Staff Non Commissioned Officers immediately after the detachment departed. In mid-June the company (-) was alerted to deploy immediately. Due to the reduced personnel readiness status, HQMC changed the deployment plan and ordered that a platoon be assigned to deploy with First Battalion, 26th Marines that had been activated at Camp Pendleton. The remainder of the company was ordered to move to Camp Pendleton to refit.

At the conclusion of Hastings the detachment was attached to Third Reconnaissance Battalion that had just arrived in Phu Bai from DaNang, having been replaced by the First Reconnaissance Battalion that had just begun arriving with the First Marine Division. Shortly, they were joined by the platoon that had come in country with 1/26.

They patrolled in Thua Thien Province until early January, 1967, when a task organized Special Purpose group carried out a prisoner rescue attempt. The remainder were sent to Khe Sanh where they developed the intelligence of a large enemy buildup, that was the prelude to The Hill Fights that occurred in April 1967.

Reunited, what was left of the three platoons, returned to Phu Bai to await the arrival of the company(-). Having been brought up to strength and operational readiness, the company was reunited on April 27, 1967, just in time for the NVA offensive to seize Quang Tri Province. The logistics element arrive at the "Ramp" at Dong Ha just in time for the opening salvos of the NVA artillery attacks that would continue daily until late Autumn.

The operational element experienced a mortar attack in Phu Bai at the same time resulting in several shrapnel wounds, only one of which, required evacuation. The new arrivals were integrated with combat veterans and the entire eighteen teams conducted a zone reconnaissance in the Cobi Than Tan Valley east of Hue City before displacing to Dong Ha.

Upon arrival at Dong Ha in early May the Commanding Officer assumed command of Third Recon Battalion (Forward), which had reconnaissance responsibility for all of Quang Tri Province except the Khe Sanh TAOR (Tactical Area of Operations). The company patrolled the area north of Highway nine to the DMZ, while the Battalion Company was targeted south of Highway Nine to the Thua Thien border. Occasional circumstances caused deviation from that concept, but, for the most part, those deviations were rare. Third Force continued that operational commitment until the Third Division left country in November 1969.

Third Force was placed under command of The Third Marine Expeditionary Force and operated in general support of IIId MAF until deactivated in mid-1970.

Mission Training Plan

Training within the Company is outlined by the Mission Training Plan (MTP). It is used in conjunction with the training and exercises that are conducted by the Marine Expeditionary Units for their "Special Operations Capable" certification. It follows a systematic approach to training, and the emphasis is to "train as they expect to fight".

"The best form of WELFARE for our Marines and sailors is first class training; this saves unnecessary casualties". —MTP quote by S-3 of FORECON companies.

The Mission Training Plan has five phases, and is based on a two-year platoon cycle. Training is ongoing and continuous, and functions as if it were a loop. Before FORECON operators are "Special Operations Capable" they follow the Company's MTP, which underlines the training protocol of the Pre-deployment Training Program (PTP).

 Phase 1: Individual Training
 Phase 2: Unit Training
 Phase 3: MEU (SOC) Training
 Phase 4: MEU (SOC) Deployment
 Phase 5: MEU (SOC) Post Deployment

Phase 1
The Marine candidates who had passed the initial yet vigorous indoctrination exam must undergo and complete a series of courses required for the designated MOS 0326 [formerly 8654], "Reconnaissance Marine, Parachutist/Combatant Diver Qualified," known as the 'accession pipeline.'

Their courses to its various schools are intertwined with the Pre-deployment Training Program (PTP), a training protocol of the Fleet Marine Force–its task forces–that are conducted yearly in a perpetual, continuous cycle. The reconnaissance Marines within FORECON community are unique in that it is the volition of the individual Marine to remain another two-year detachment to the Force Reconnaissance Company. Those that had chosen to remain in the company will proceed to the advanced course of instructions, and again during the next FMF rotational training cycle, and forth. This is due in respects to their status of having already completed and qualified in the appropriate course required for MOS 0321; which otherwise, the initial training, e.g. the accession pipeline, are reserved for the candidates.

The first phase in FORECON's Mission Training Plan takes place within the MEU's Initial Training Phase.

Accession Pipeline

 Infantry Rifleman Course – Infantry Training Battalion, US Marine Corps Schools of Infantry (East or West)
Basic Reconnaissance Course (BRC) – United States Marine Corps School of Infantry (West)
Survival, Evasion, Resistance and Escape (SERE) [Level "C"]/Navy Remote Training Sites; NAS North Island, Warner Springs, California.
United States Marine Corps Combatant Diver Course – Navy Diving Salvage and Training Center, Naval Support Activity Panama City, Florida
Basic Airborne Course – United States Army Airborne School, Fort Benning, Georgia
Multi Mission Parachute Course – CPS Complete Parachute Systems, Coolidge, Arizona
High Risk Personnel (HRP) Course – MCB Quantico, Virginia
Special Operations Training Group (SOTG) – I MEF, Camp Pendleton; II MEF, Camp Lejeune; III MEF, Camp S.D. Butler

Special schools
During the "Individual Training Phase", the candidates are undergoing the accession pipeline to become qualified MOS 0321 (Reconnaissance Marine). After further training, the already-billeted Force Recon operators (who had already completed the required courses in the accession pipeline [BRC, parachutist and diving, and SERE/HRP courses]) attain MOS 0326 (Reconnaissance Marine, parachute and combatant diver qualified) and may continue to remain with FORECON after the three-year rotation cycle. They may be selected for additional advanced cross-service training from other schools provided by the Special Operations Forces (SOF) units. Although these specialized schools are not necessarily required, they are highly encouraged.

Many Marine Corps 'training liaisons' represent the Marines at many cross-services schools, to ensure training slots and openings are met and filled by the Marines that requested, or were recommended, for advanced training. Some of these courses may not be able to facilitate the Marine students; the instructors of these schools resort to complement the Marines' requested syllabus by designing similar subsidiary courses. This argument becomes clear on whether Marines may, or may not, actually attend the Basic Underwater Demolition/SEAL training (BUD/S). Nonetheless, in the past, selected operators within Force Recon had attended the courses of instructions provided by BUD/S Instructors and their completion is documented in their military Service Record Book (SRB) or Officer Qualification Record (OQR).

Tactical Air Control Party – one per team
U.S. Army Ranger School – all team leaders and above
U.S. Army Reconnaissance and Surveillance Leaders Course – all team leaders and above
U.S. Army Pathfinder School – all team leaders and above
U.S. Army Jumpmaster School – minimum two per platoon
Military Free-Fall Jumpmaster Course – minimum two per platoon
Mountain Leaders (Summer/Winter) Course – one per team
 USMC Scout Sniper Course – minimum one per team
 HRST Master Course – minimum two per platoon
 Dive Supervisor Course – minimum two per platoon
 LAR V Technician Course – two per platoon

Phase 2
The second phase of the MTP also takes place during the MEU's PTP Initial Training Phase.

Training Cell
The Training Cell (T-Cell) is regulated by the experienced staff non-commissioned officers (SNCOs) of FMF Recon company's Operations Section (S-3). This removes the responsibility of coordinating training from the platoon headquarters, and permits them to train with their men (rather than to just oversee the training).

"Fight as you train, train as you fight!"—quote by unknown.

An additional and no less important advantage to the T-Cell is that it acts as a training ground for future platoon sergeants. Those assigned to the T-Cell are all highly trained and experienced operators. Some have deployed as platoon sergeants, and some have not. Experienced FORECON operators within T-Cell monitor, evaluate and improve the training to ensure that exercises meet real-world conditions.
 Advanced Long Range Communications Package (3 weeks) – It is conducted by the Company Communications Section. As the term deep reconnaissance indicates, the platoon will operate well forward of other forces. In order to report observations, calls for fire or extract, all members need to have a complete and thorough knowledge of the sophisticated communication equipment carried. It includes manual Morse code, and long-range high frequency (HF), satellite, multi-band, and digital communications.
 Weapons and Tactics Package (3 weeks) – Involves 5,000–8,000 rounds fired from the M4 carbine equipped with a Special Operations Peculiar Modification kit and the MEU(SOC) Pistol (.45 ACP). A live fire and maneuvering exercise in immediate action (IA) drills within close range of rotary wing support, as well as transportation, is conducted on the third week. As the Marines become familiar with their weapons, they conduct field exercise, force-on-force, live-fire drills using a militarized version of the Simunitions kit called the Special Effects Small Arms Marking Systems, or SESAMS. The Marking Cartridge ammunition contains a sabot and a small, plastic round encasing a colored detergent or paint, usually red or blue.
 Threat Weapons Familiarization Package (1 week) – Concludes "knowledge of weapons" with identification and operation of threat weapons used by adversaries of the United States. Threat Weapons include assault, automatic and mobilized weapons.
 Force Fires Package – Gives the Marines a working knowledge of fixed and rotary wing close air support and Naval Gun Surface Fire (NGSF) by using the AN/PEQ-1 SOFLAM to "paint" their targets.

 Mobile Reconnaissance Package – Covers operating and maintaining the M998 HMMWV and the Interim Fast Attack Vehicle. Rapid deployment of FORECON requires fast mobilization. The current IFAV is a replacement of the two earlier FAVs, the M-151A2 and the Chenowth FAV that were employed in the 1980s and 1990s.
 Advanced Airborne Package – Extremely important to Force Recon for inserting Marines behind enemy lines. In this three-week period, Marines will transition from conventional Low Level Static Line (LLSL) insertions into the hallmark HALO techniques. Usually it consists of consecutive night jumps with night combat equipment, but HALO training is done in the Paraloft of the S3 Section using a complex virtual reality-based (VR) computer system. While wearing a VR headset device, the Marines hang suspended from the Paraloft ceiling that resembles the MC-5 Ram Air parachute. Many simulations are factored in this Virtual Reality Parachute Simulation; it allows the Marine to jump at high altitudes and visually check his main canopy for proper deployment, alleviate malfunctions, to cutaway and deploy a reserve parachute, then employ guidance and control to an unmarked drop zone (DZ).
 Combat Trauma Package – Examination of first aid and medical treatment that can prepare Marines in many realistic scenarios where Marines can become casualties. This package is built for Marines to give them confidence and knowledge to apply medical attention to themselves or others while operating in hazard environments whether they are engaged in combat or not.
 Amphibious Training Package (2 weeks) – While Marines were introduced to amphibious reconnaissance from the BRC, the T-Cell outlines the Amphibious Training package before they are attached to a MEU(SOC), this package refines their ability to conduct amphibious operations, and conventional and selected maritime special operations capabilities incorporating all their skills for Marines to work as a team. Refreshes long-range nautical navigation, and refines the platoon SOP for conducting hydrographic surveys. Launch and recovery is from a variety of naval vessels, including surface combatants and submarines. This training takes place at Seal Beach and San Diego, California on the west coast; and Onslow Beach, North Carolina on the east coast.
 Combatant Dive Package – Designed for concentrating on the unit's capabilities in the water. They will learn more about the LAR-V rebreather as they have been taught at the USMC Combatant Dive Course. The T-Cell will introduce the Diver Propulsion Device (DPD) and the "buddy line", a  pipe made from composite plastics that every Marine is attached to when diving. This ensures that the team remain close together as the water may be impossible for visuals contact in subsurface swimming.

Other training packages are available to mold the Marines into a fully functional Recon unit, including long range patrolling in desert areas, such as Twentynine Palms or MCAS Yuma, mountainous terrain and other environments relevant in peacetime or conflict. At the end of Phase 2 Training, the platoon is completely stood up in all aspects of the long-range reconnaissance mission. More importantly, they have spent 6 months of 'platoon-oriented' training together.

Phase 3

Special Operations Training Group (SOTG)

This six-month training phase emphasizing more in the direct action, or "black operations". It is conducted by the Special Operations Training Group (SOTG). This phase takes place during the MEU's PTP Intermediate Training Phase. These courses involves both aspects of maritime and urbanized environments and how to apply close quarters combat and science in demolition, gas/oil platform (GOPLAT) training, cordon and search, Visit, Board, Search, and Seizure (VBSS), shipboard assaults training and humanitarian operations. The recon operators get the chance to train in unfamiliar urban areas and maritime structures.

Phase 4

Once the SOC Certification Final Training Phase is finished, the MEU with the detached Force Recon platoon as a functional special operations capable force. Then they sail on a six-month deployment. This long deployment is known as the 'Deployment Phases' to Force Recon, they sail from either three locations, off the east or west coast, or Okinawa. The I MEF on the west would deploy its Marine Expeditionary Units (MEUs) to the western Pacific and the II MEF's MEUs on the east coast sails across the Atlantic Ocean to either the Mediterranean Sea or the Persian Gulf. The III MEF's 31st MEU in Okinawa is to be used as a contingency for reinforced support of an area spanning from southwest Asia to the central Pacific. The III MEF is the only MEF of the FMF that is permanently fully deployed at all times.

While Force Recon is afloat, they still remain focused on their self-disciplined training sessions. They conduct small arms live fire training on the deck of the ships and physical fitness training. In many cases, foreign maritime forces alike participate in joint exercises or training maneuvers, such as the Royal Thai Marine Corps, British Royal Marines, and Australian Forces. But while they may be training, the MEU are capable of projecting fully forward deployed operational task forces. Thus, epitomizing the infamous Marine Corps slogan, "force-in-readiness".

Phase 5
The last phase is the post-deployment phase. After 18 months of training and deployment, the platoon is granted 30 days of military leave. Once a Force Recon operator has finished deployment, they have a decision to make. What makes Force Recon unique from Division Recon, and the other SOFs, is the career style that is being placed in the Force Recon company structure. They can choose to stay with the Force Recon Company and continue their assignment with the MEU, recycling its loop cycle; or they can get release from the FORECON company and go back to their original assignment, whether administration, motor transport, or infantry. However, on average, approximately 50% of the platoon will leave, their time in Force having expired.

Equipment

The primary weapons used by both Division and FMF Recon assets are typically the same standard-issued weapons in the arsenal of the Marine Corps. However, since Force Recon's missions are directly involved in parachuting and underwater insertions, they demand weapons and equipment that are essential to their job. Their equipment reflects on which ever tasks that have been assigned by the MAGTF, MEF, or MEU commander; either direct action (black) or deep recon (green) operations.

Table of Equipment (T/E)
Some equipment only fits the needs for one particular mission over another. There is however some equipment that is used for both black and green operations, and these pieces of gear are usually combat vests, flak and armor jackets (or systems), and harnesses for use in hasty extraction measures.

Particularly during green operations, these missions normally encompass surveillance and reconnaissance. The equipment items carried into the field are usually cameras, scopes, and most importantly communications. Two recon Marines serve as radiomen in the team. Each team/platoon often brings two field radios that are able to withstand the elements of seawater, and rugged patrolling as they tread inland—if one radio fails, they resort to the supplemental radio. This is to ensure that vital information can always be sent to the commander, and to the S-3/S-6 shop, or similar intelligence collection agencies. More common in today's infrastructure, much of the intelligence-gathered information is sent to and processed by the Marine Expeditionary Force's "Surveillance, Reconnaissance, and Intelligence Group" (SRIG).

For black operations, the Marines carry weapons that are more of the close-quarter combative use; grenades, carbine rifles, sub-machine guns (SMGs), and any tool to use for breaching barricades and doors. They can be equipped with laser designating devices to "paint" their targets with laser-guiding coordinates to deliver payload to un-expecting targets. Since they are "bringing the fight to the enemy", they do not rely on camouflage as stealthy action is not a factor in these situations.

Special equipment

Throughout training and real life operations, jet fins, snorkels and low-volume double lens dive masks are used. In addition to the SCUBA equipment used in amphibious mission-essential tasks, Force Recon maintains and operates parachutes. This is the main difference and separation from Division Reconnaissance—all FORECON operators are required to be parachutists. The parachutist equipment is stored in the Force Reconnaissance's Parachute Loft.

Parachute pack systems 
The parachute is one of the trademarks of Force Recon, throughout its existence the operators have extensively used a wide variety of parachutes. In the mid-1950s, they used the T-10, then later adopting the Capewell canopy release which provided a cut-away to reduce the deadly effect of drag. The T-10 became the most frequented parachute; which had two variants, one for low-level static line (LLSL) and the other for military free fall (MFF) descends. They had numerous parachutes listed under the Table of Equipment (T/E) that had been contained in the Paraloft. Even in its formative days in the Marine Corps Test Unit#1, the operators and testers of the Naval Parachute Unit (NPU) at El Centro had tested and sported numerous parachutes, adding modifications and suggestions that soon were adopted by other parachutists. By the 1990s, the MC-4 and MC-5 ram air parachutes became the feasible choice, as it allows more detailed and accurate landing in smaller areas, easy to control—especially during oscillation of the canopy. Plus, it was formed to modulate between the LLSL and MFF without having to consort to a different pack.

These are parachutes that are still contained in the T/E of the Parachute Loft, however some may not be currently in use:
 T-10
 MC1-B
 MC-series ram air parachutes (MC-4, MC-5)
 Canopies (Main & Reserve): Surface area 
 Altitude range:  AG> to  ft MSL
 Forward speed: 15–25 MPH
 Rate of descent: 4–18 ft/sec
 Maximum Load: 
 Multi-Mission Parachute System (MMPS) [currently being implemented—replacing the older MC-5]

Parachutist Individual Equipment Kit 
The Parachutist Individual Equipment Kit (PIEK) contains all the Force Recon's parachutist clothing and equipment assigned by Force Recon's Paraloft. They are used for the high-altitude MFFs (HAHO or HALO) and LLSL parachute operations. Due to extreme cold encountered during high altitude parachute operations, the parachutist must have protection from the environment.

 Gore-Tex Jumpsuit
 Polartec Jumpsuit Liner
 Cotton Ripstop Jumpsuit
 Flyer's Gloves
 Gore-Tex Cold-weather Gloves
 Overboots
 MA2-30 Altimeter
 Helmet
 Flyer's Helmet Bag
 Flyer's Kitbag—used to carry operator's rucksack, ammunition, communications, etc.

Single Action Release Personal Equipment Lowering Equipment (SARPELS) 
The Force Recon operators are equipped with a complete equipment lowering system for both LLSL and MFF parachute operations. It allows them carry various configurations of all their individual mission-essential equipment, usually contained within their Flyer's Kitbag. The Single Action Release Personal Equipment Lowering Equipment (SARPELS) provides easy access to their weapons and equipment upon parachute landing and has a single-action release capability. It can be front or rear mounted, whichever is preferred. It is used to minimize injuries in landing due to heavy load of equipment. The parachutists must maneuver themselves in order not to drop onto their gear during parachute landing falls.

 SARPELS Cargo Carrier
 Horizontal & Vertical Cargo Carrier Securing Straps
 Single Action Release Handle
 MFF Equipment Attaching Strap
  LLSL Lowering Line
  MFF Lowering Line

Annual Warrior Competition
The 24th MEU 2nd Force Reconnaissance Company won the 2010 Annual Warrior Competition against tactical units from all over the world.

Creed
Realizing it is my choice and my choice alone to be a Reconnaissance Marine, I accept all challenges involved with this profession. Forever shall I strive to maintain the tremendous reputation of those who went before me.

Exceeding beyond the limitations set down by others shall be my goal. Sacrificing personal comforts and dedicating myself to the completion of the reconnaissance mission shall be my life. Physical fitness, mental attitude, and high ethics—The title of Recon Marine is my honor.

Conquering all obstacles, both large and small, I shall never quit. To quit, to surrender, to give up is to fail. To be a Recon Marine is to surpass failure; To overcome, to adapt and to do whatever it takes to complete the mission.

On the battlefield, as in all areas of life, I shall stand tall above the competition. Through professional pride, integrity, and teamwork, I shall be the example for all Marines to emulate.

Never shall I forget the principles I accepted to become a Recon Marine. Honor, Perseverance, Spirit and Heart. A Recon Marine can speak without saying a word and achieve what others can only imagine.

Swift, Silent, Deadly.

Force Recon in media

Books
 The Marvel comic book character The Punisher (aka Frank Castle) was a Vietnam era Force Recon Marine. The 2010s reboot of the character gave him a similar background, updated to the Global War on Terror.
 The Marvel comic book character Moon Knight (aka Marc Spector) was a Force Recon Marine, CIA operative, and mercenary.
 The Image comic book character Spawn (aka Lt. Colonel Albert Francis "Al" Simmons) was a Force Recon Marine, Secret Service Agent, and CIA assassin.
 Matthew Reilly's 1998 novel Ice Station (and its sequels) are based around the exploits of Force Recon Captain Shane Schofield and his team of marines.
 In the Cut & Run series by Abigail Roux, FBI Agent Tyler Grady, Detective Nicholas O'Flaherty, Owen Johns and Duruand 'Digger' Garrigou are former Force Recon Marines of team 'Sidewinder'.
 The Force Recon series of books by James V. Smith follows a quartet of Force Recon Marines known as Team Midnight.
 The Force 5 Recon series of books by Peter Telep, using the pseudonym P.W. Storm, follows a team of Force Recon Marines on missions in Pakistan, North Korea and the Philippines.
 According to his character bio, Jason Bourne, of the Bourne series of books by author Robert Ludlum, was a Force Recon Marine Captain.
 The 2004 book Generation Kill written by Rolling Stone journalist Evan Wright chronicles his experience as an embedded reporter with the 1st Reconnaissance Battalion during the 2003 invasion of Iraq. The book was later adapted into a seven-part miniseries by HBO in 2008.
 The 2004 book The Pepperdogs by Bing West features a team of Force Recon Reservists caught between sides during the NATO peacekeeping effort following the Bosnian War.

TV shows
 Shooter: Ryan Phillippe portrays Bob Lee Swagger, a Force Recon Marine and MARSOC CSO Scout Sniper,
 Homeland: Damian Lewis portrays Nicholas Brody, a Force Recon Marine Scout Sniper taken prisoner during the Iraq War
 Colony: Tory Kittles portrays Eric Broussard, a former Marine Force Recon / CIA Assassin / private military contractor now a Resistance operative.
Luke Cage, portrayed by Mike Colter in the Netflix series Luke Cage, set in the Marvel Cinematic Universe, is a former Force Recon Marine. 
 The Punisher aka Frank Castle, portrayed by Jon Bernthal, first introduced in Daredevil and then starring in his own series The Punisher a 2017 live-action Netflix series set in the Marvel Cinematic Universe is a former Marine Force Recon Lieutenant who becomes a vigilante to avenge his murdered family. Ben Barnes portrays Billy Russo, Castle's best friend who served alongside him in Force Recon as a Scout Sniper and who, after leaving the military, started his own private military contractor company, Anvil.

Film
 Val Kilmer portrayed Force Recon Marine Robert Scott in the film Spartan.
 Robert Blake in Electra Glide in Blue (1973), portrays a Vietnam-era Veteran Force Recon Marine who is a highway patrol motorcycle cop striving to become a detective.
 Jean-Claude Van Damme plays a former Force Recon Marine, Chance Boudreaux, in the action movie, Hard Target (1993).
 Recon Marines are portrayed in the 1995 film Dead Presidents, as disenchanted vets who stage an armored car robbery.
 Tom Berenger played as Force Recon Marine Scout Sniper Master Gunnery Sergeant Thomas Beckett and Chad Michael Collins plays as Force Recon Scout Sniper Gunnery Sergeant Brandon Beckett in the Sniper film series.
 In the 1996 film The Rock, a group of rogue Force Recon, led by disenchanted Brigadier General Francis Xavier Hummel, played by Ed Harris, seize control of Alcatraz Island during a guided tour and take 81 tourists hostage in the prison cells. Hummel threatens to launch 15 stolen M55 rockets against the population of San Francisco unless the government pays ransom and reparations to the families of 83 FORECON Marines who died on illegal, clandestine missions under his command and whose deaths were not honored.
 Wesley Snipes portrayed Mark Sheridan, a former trained operative and a veteran Force Reconnaissance Marine in the U.S. Marshals.
 Denzel Washington plays former Force Recon platoon commander and CIA Officer, John Creasy, in the suspense/action movie, Man On Fire (2004).
 Mark Wahlberg portrayed former Force Recon Scout Sniper, Bob Lee Swagger, in the film Shooter.
 Ray Stevenson plays the Punisher, a former Force Recon Marine-turned-vigilante, in Punisher: War Zone (2008); in preparation for his role, the actor received military and weapons training by former Force Recon Marines, months prior to filming.
 Clint Eastwood played a Force Recon Gunnery Sergeant assigned to lead a platoon of Marines from the 2nd Reconnaissance Battalion during the invasion of Grenada in the film Heartbreak Ridge.
 Michael Jai White portrayed Force Recon Marine Colonel Albert Francis "Al" Simmons in the film Spawn.
 In the movie SWAT, Samuel L. Jackson portrays Sergeant Daniel "Hondo" Harrelson, a former Force Recon Marine and LAPD SWAT Team Leader.
 Mark Wahlberg portrayed a Force Recon First Lieutenant turned CIA Officer in the movie Mile 22.

Video games
 Sergeant Paul Jackson from Call of Duty 4: Modern Warfare is a Force Recon operator, one of the two factions and four characters played as in the game. Force Recon is also a playable faction in the online multiplayer.
 Crysis 2 features a Force Recon Marine named Alcatraz as the main protagonist. Several other Force Recon Marines appear as supporting characters during several of the game's missions.
 First Lieutenant Jason Kolchek and Sergeant Nick Kay, two of the five protagonists in The Dark Pictures Anthology: House of Ashes.
 A 5-man Force Recon team call-sign "Razor" is the main protagonist of game ARMA 2.
 In the PlayStation 2 survival-horror game, Extermination, you play Sergeant Dennis Riley, a member of Force Recon. 
 Alex Mason, the main protagonist of Call of Duty: Black Ops, was a former Captain in Force Recon before being recruited by the CIA. Supporting NPC Frank Woods was also a Master Sergeant in Force Recon before joining the CIA.
 The main protagonist of the alternate history first-person shooter Singularity, Nathaniel Renko, is a Force Recon Captain.
 In Resident Evil Zero Billy Coen was a 2nd Lieutenant in the Marine Force Recon. He was dishonorably discharged after he was framed for the murder of innocent civilians.

See also
 Semper fidelis

Notes

References

 Field Manual (FM) 7-92, The Infantry Reconnaissance Platoon and Squad (Airborne, Air Assault, Light Infantry) 
 Marine Administrative Message (MARADMIN) 417/07, Reconnaissance Marine Lateral Move Policy and Procedures 
 Marine Corps Order (MCO) 1510.125, Individual Training Standards (ITS) Systems for Marine Combat Water Survival Training (MCWST) 
 MCO 1543.12, Material Fielding Plan for the Combat Rubber Reconnaissance Craft (CRRC) 
 MCO 3500.20B, Marine Corps Parachuting and Diving Policy and Program Administration 
 MCO 3500.42A, Marine Corps Helicopter Rope Suspension Techniques (HRST) Policy and Program Administration 
 MCO 3502.2A, Marine Expeditionary Units (Special Operations Capable) (MEU(SOC)) Special Skills Certification Program 
 MCO 3502.3A, Marine Expeditionary Unit (Special Operations Capable) Predeployment Training Program (PTP) 
 Marine Corps Reference Publication (MCRP) 2-1C, Marine Air Ground Task Force Intelligence Dissemination 
 MCRP 5-12DC, Organization of the United States Marine Corps 
 Marine Corps Warfighting Publication (MCWP) 2-1, Intelligence Operations 
 MCWP 2-15.1, Remote Sensor Operations 
NAVMC 3500.55B, Reconnaissance (Recon) Training and Readiness (T&R) Manual
 Operational Requirements Document (ORD) for an Underwater Reconnaissance Capability (URC)

External links
 US Marine Corps
 Force Recon Association
 SpecialOperations.com Marine Recon Page
 Recon Marines
 Global Security USMC Unit Listings
 SpecWarNet: USMC Recon Battalions